The Djoué River is a river of the Republic of the Congo. It is a right tributary of the Congo River.

Course

The Djoué River rises in the Pool Department to the north of Mayama, and flows through that town.
It then follows a meandering southeast course through Ngoma-Tsétse in the Brazzaville Department and through the west of the city of Brazzaville, entering the Congo where it leaves the Pool Malebo. 
The river flows through the Kintamo Rapids at its mouth, described by the English explorer Henry Morton Stanley on 12 March 1877 as having an impressive beauty rarely equaled.

Ramsar site

At its mouth the river flows through the  Ramsar site no.1857, Les Rapides du Congo-Djoué.
It includes rapids, permanent and temporary rivers, marshes, forested islands and aquaculture ponds.
There are three forested islands in the site. 
One of them, the Île du Diable, is a refuge for many birds.
The waterways support fish and invertebrates, and is a spawning ground.
Although protected by law, there is no management plan in place, and the site is used for market gardening, fishing and harvesting of wine palm oil.

Water quality

An analysis of the water for the purpose of determining treatment needed to make it potable found an acceptable pH 7.5, but turbidity of 15 NTU: the water is very muddy.
The water is soft, and has low levels of inorganic pollutants other than phosphate ions.
It could be disinfected with calcium hypochlorite and clarified with calcium sulfate and lime.

Hydroelectricity

In March 2013 Andritz Hydro Switzerland was awarded a contract to rehabilitate and upgrade HPP Djoué.
The power plant had been out of operation since April 2007, when the control room was flooded, and the tailrace channel had been completely silted up by the biannual floods of the Congo River. 
The renovated plant would supply 2 x 9.06MW.

Notes

Sources

 

Rivers of the Republic of the Congo